Bembla is a town in the Monastir Governorate, Tunisia. Governed by the joint municipality of Bembla-Mnara, it is also the seat of an  governoral delegation.

References

Populated places in Tunisia